"Almost Home" is a song recorded by American singer and songwriter Mariah Carey. It is the main track from the 2013 Walt Disney Pictures film Oz the Great and Powerful. Commissioned by Disney, Simone Porter, Justin Gray, and Lindsey Ray wrote the bulk of the record. When Carey signed on to sing the song, she and Stargate's Tor Erik Hermansen and Mikkel Eriksen would later change it a bit and ultimately, complete it. On February 6, 2013, it was announced that Mariah Carey had recorded the song for the Disney film with production team Stargate, and that it would be released through digital download on February 19, 2013.

The song delivers an inspirational message, "Almost Home" has received generally favorable reviews from music critics, many of whom praised the vocal performance of Carey, calling it a "return" to her sound of the 1990s after the lukewarm reviews given to her recent releases, including "Triumphant (Get 'Em)" (2012). Following the announcement of the single, it was revealed that Carey had recorded an accompanying music video for it with David LaChapelle. The video premiered on March 8, 2013, the same day Oz the Great and Powerful was released theatrically.

Background and composition

On February 6, 2013, it was revealed that Carey was working with Stargate on a song titled "Almost Home", as the lead single from the soundtrack album for the movie Oz the Great and Powerful, with the singer saying in a statement that the song has "a message that works beautifully with the film. It's a feel-good record; it gives you the feeling of reaching your home and being with people that you love." Carey has since stated that she dislikes the song. The song was recorded in New York City at Roc The Mic Studios, and released in a partnership between Def Jam Recordings and Disney Music Group for the promotional campaign for the movie. The single's artwork was unveiled through Carey's Instagram account on February 14, 2013, with the single itself being released on February 19, 2013. However, it leaked the day before.

A pop song, "Almost Home" contains elements of other music genres such as R&B, hip hop and EDM. Carey delivers an inspirational message with the song, and, as described by Jocelyn Vena of MTV, the singer's placed "right in the mythical land from the famed movie", singing during the chorus, "When you're almost there / And you're almost home / Just open up your eyes and go / When you're almost there / Almost home / Know you're not alone / You're almost home."

The song is performed in the key of B major in common time with a tempo of 87 beats per minute.  For the final chorus, the song's key shifts up one semitone to B major.  Carey's vocal range spans from F3 to E5 in the song.

Critical response
"Almost Home" has received generally favorable reviews from music critics. Alyssa Toomey from E! praised the song, writing, "If you've ever closed your eyes, clicked your heels and wished for more Mariah Carey, then you're in luck, because your musical prayers have been answered", while Jody Rosen of Rolling Stone considered the song's chorus as infectious. Los Angeles Times reviewer Mikael Wood said the song is not as powerful as Carey's "Always Be My Baby" (1995) or "We Belong Together" (2005), but thought the instrumentation was entirely built around her vocals, "which arc upward until they crest in a key change that delivers the thrill we've grown to expect from her.". Alisha Harris of Slate Magazine was surprised of Carey's appearance on this single as a pop star and stated Carey's dominance twenty years post her debut: "“The minimalist beat sounds rather over familiar at this point, echoing various hits going back to the late ’90s. The song is pleasant enough in parts, but almost instantly forgettable. As a Carey fan, I’m holding out hope that her new album will have more memorable tracks, even if her lead single, released last year, was also less than stellar. And while the ballad certainly doesn’t rank among the singer’s best work, it does provide the latest evidence of what we can count on after all these years: She’s still got the voice.”

Sal Cinquemani of Slant Magazine said that, with "Almost Home" and "Triumphant (Get 'Em)", Carey proves she still is "the queen of playing it safe," continuing that her vocals are heavily Auto-Tuned to the point of being "virtually unrecognizable". Cinquemani also thought the song was over-produced and dated, comparing it to Alicia Keys' 2007 single "No One". Kyle Anderson of Entertainment Weekly gave a mixed review on the song, saying that while Carey's "body of work is pretty phenomenal, [...] it has been a while since she delivered a really transcendent single." Anderson continued saying that "Almost Home" could have been sung by most anybody. Melinda Newman of Hitfix was critical towards "Almost Home", deeming the instrumentation as "cheesy", and commenting that Carey sounds bored singing the song, with her vocals being heavily compressed.

Commercial performance
In France, the song managed to peak at number 185. The song sold 19,000 digital downloads in its debut week in the United States. Despite the weak performance, "Almost Home" managed to peak within the top 20 on the R&B Songs and the Adult Contemporary charts at number 18 and 20 respectively. In Lebanon, the song peaked at number 10, becoming the artist's first top 10 hit in the country.

Music video

Synopsis and background
Following the announcement of the single, it was revealed that Carey had recorded an accompanying music video for it with David LaChapelle, who previously directed the music video for Carey's "Loverboy" (2001). On February 19, 2013, a teaser of the video was aired on Good Morning America. The video premiered on March 8, 2013 at Carey's VEVO channel, the same day Oz the Great and Powerful hit theaters. LaChapelle captures the singer belting the Stargate co-produced song, alone, while donning a beautiful black gown. The photographer-director incorporates footage from the fantasy feature throughout the -minute-long visual.

Reception
Almost Home was met with positive reviews by critics. Richard of DJ Booth commanded the Norwegian production team for the production. He added: "Let’s be real—as a twentysomething male music journalist, I’m about as far from the target market for Disney‘s Oz the Great and Powerful as a consumer could possibly be. That said, I can’t hate on anything that leads to fresh tunes from pop diva (and current American Idol judge) Mariah Carey. On Almost Home, a single created for inclusion in the film, Norwegian beat crew Stargate‘s soaring synth boardwork bangs in the back as Mimi assures us that we’ll be back in Kansas before we know it, emphasizing the point with plenty of her trademark vocal fireworks."

Accolades

Track listing
Digital download
 "Almost Home" – 3:47

Credits and personnel
Recording
 Recorded at Roc the Mic Studios, New York City

Personnel
 Mariah Carey: Lead vocalist, singer, songwriter, producer.
 Justin Gray: Writer, producer
 Lindsey Ray: singer, songwriter
 Mikkel Storleer Eriksen & Tor Erik Hermansen: Record producers, songwriters
 Simon Porter: songwriter.
 Production, instruments, programming – Def Jam, Disney Music Group

Charts

Radio and release history

References

External links
 

2010s ballads
2013 singles
2013 songs
Disney songs
Electropop ballads
Island Records singles
Mariah Carey songs
Music videos directed by David LaChapelle
Pop ballads
Contemporary R&B ballads
Song recordings produced by Stargate (record producers)
Songs written for films
Songs written by Mariah Carey
Songs written by Mikkel Storleer Eriksen
Songs written by Tor Erik Hermansen
Walt Disney Records singles